Novecento is Italian for “nine hundred” and refers to the 1900s (i.e., one-thousand-and-nine-hundreds, which is a near-synonym for the 20th century). It may also refer to:

 Novecento (group), Italian music group
 Novecento Italiano, a style begun in Italy in the 1920s
 Nik Novecento (1964–1987), Italian actor and television personality
 1900 (film), a 1976 Italian epic film directed by Bernardo Bertolucci
 Novecento, soundtrack album to the film by Ennio Morricone
 Novecento, theater monologue by Alessandro Baricco

See also
Museo del Novecento, or Museum of the Twentieth Century, museum in Milan, Italy
The Legend of 1900, 1998 Italian drama film, after the monologue by Baricco